Royal Air Force Nutts Corner or more simply RAF Nutts Corner is a former Royal Air Force station located  east of Crumlin, County Antrim, Northern Ireland and  north west of Belfast.

It was originally a civil airfield, then it became a military airfield and subsequently Northern Ireland's main civil airport until the 1960s.

Civil operations
The province's first London service began from Nutts Corner in 1934.

Second World War
Civil operations were largely abandoned at both Nutts Corner and RAF Aldergrove during the Second World War when it became an important RAF Coastal Command station and was also used as a transport hub for aircraft arriving from the United States. No. 120 Squadron RAF operated Consolidated Liberator maritime patrol bombers from the station from 1941.

The following units were here at some point:

Post war
In 1946 civil air operations were transferred from HMS Gadwall/Belfast Harbour Airport (now the George Best Belfast City Airport) to RAF Nutts Corner due to the longer runways available at that airfield.  Other reasons included the limited space available at Belfast for expansion and the danger associated with obstacles such as the cranes around Belfast harbour.  Other sites were studied as possible alternative civil airports including RAF Long Kesh and Lisburn. The advantage of choosing Nutts Corner was the large amount of existing hardstanding which was necessary for civil aircraft movements.  The former RAF station then became known as Belfast-Nutts Corner Airport.

By the end of the 1950s the steep approach necessary for aircraft flying to Nutts Corner was deemed unsuitable.  This was due to the location of the airport, close to the Belfast mountains and the obstacles located there, particularly transmitters and aerials.  Another factor was the fact that of Nutts Corner's three runways, only one was suitable for modern aircraft. Aldergrove's two runways set at 100 degrees (07-25 and 17-35) to each other made operations possible even if conditions (particularly wind) changed dramatically.  The decision to restore civil flights to Aldergrove was taken in July 1959.  The move was made official in September 1963 and a month later the present terminal was opened.

Current use
A section of the A26 Moira Road, running from Nutts Corner Roundabout for approximately 2 km, is constructed on one of the old runways.  The airfield was used from 1984 to 2004 for events such as the Irish Superbike Championships and Rallycross, but it was restricted due to noise complaints from local residents. A small section of the circuit continues to be used by the Northern Ireland Carting Club (NICA) and the Ulster Karting Club. The site is also used for a weekly market and a model aircraft club is on the site.

Accidents and incidents
On 18 February 1942 a Liberator bomber which was leaving for an Atlantic patrol failed to gain height, struck a radio mast and crashed. Six of the crew survived but four were killed.
On 21 August 1942 the World War I air ace Harry King Goode was killed on a demonstration flight with a 120 Squadron Consolidated Liberator stationed at the base.
On 27 March 1951 a Douglas Dakota 3 cargo aircraft operated by Air Transport Charter and en route from Ringway Airport, Manchester, crashed shortly after take-off following failure to gain height.  There were four fatalities, two of the three crew on board and two of the three passengers.  The subsequent investigation found that the crash resulted from a loss of engine power caused by ice formation in the carburetor intakes attributable to the captain's failure to make use of the heat controls. An extended undercarriage and the presence of snow on the wings may have also been contributory factors.
Nutts Corner was the site of the worst air disaster in Ireland, when on 5 January 1953 a British European Airways (BEA) Vickers Viking crashed after striking landing lights and then a building at the airfield, killing 27 people out of 35 on board.
On 23 October 1957 a Vickers Viscount of BEA crashed at the airport, killing all seven on board.

See also
List of former Royal Air Force stations

References

Citations

Bibliography

External links

Buildings and structures in County Antrim
Military history of County Antrim
Royal Air Force stations in Northern Ireland
World War II sites in Northern Ireland
Royal Air Force stations of World War II in the United Kingdom
1939 establishments in Northern Ireland
1946 disestablishments in Northern Ireland
Defunct airports in Northern Ireland